Sarıcalı (also, Indzhilli Sarydzhaly and Sarydzhaly) is a village and municipality in the Agdam Rayon of Azerbaijan.  It has a population of 1,848.

References

Populated places in Aghdam District